Dressed in Black: A Tribute to Johnny Cash is, as the title suggests, a tribute album to country singer Johnny Cash, released on the Dualtone label on September 17, 2002. It features several of Cash's most well-known songs, such as "Ring of Fire" and "Folsom Prison Blues", as well as a number of more obscure compositions like "I'm Gonna Sit on the Porch and Pick on My Old Guitar" and "Pack Up Your Sorrows". Various artists contributed cover versions to the album; these include Hank Williams III, The Reverend Horton Heat and Raul Malo, but the focus is primarily on less popular artists, as opposed to Kindred Spirits, the second tribute album released around the same time.

Track listing

Personnel
Mandy Barnett, Kelly Willis - vocals
Rodney Crowell, Robbie Fulks, Chris Knight, Bruce Robison, Hank Williams III - vocals, acoustic guitar
Eddie Angel, Billy Burnette, Rosie Flores, James Intveld, Raul Malo, Redd Volkaert - vocals, electric guitar
Chuck Mead - vocals, acoustic and electric guitar, producer, guitar effects
Dale Watson - vocals, guitar
Earl Poole Ball - vocals, piano
David Roe - vocals, acoustic bass, producer
Billy Block - vocals, drums
Damon Bramblett - acoustic guitar
Kenny Vaughan - acoustic and electric guitar
Ken Coomer, Al Esis, W.S. Holland, Jimmy Lester, Tom Lewis, Jerry Roe, Maxwell Schauf, Shaw Wilson - drums
Tammy Rogers - viola

Additional personnel
Paul Gannon - engineer
Hank Williams - mastering
Gina R. Binkley - design
Johnny Cash - liner notes

Chart performance

References

2002 compilation albums
Country albums by American artists
Dualtone Records compilation albums
Johnny Cash tribute albums